The Royal Institute for the Sustainable Management of Natural Resources and the Promotion of Clean Technology ( [KINT];  [IRGT]) is a Belgian non-profit organization, which was founded on 11 July 1994. Prince Laurent of Belgium is the head of the institute.

Mission
The Institute wants to promote the sustainable management of natural resources as well as the development of environment-friendly technologies. It involves both the economic and social aspects of technology-development. The institute acts as a support organization for the regional governments of Belgium (Brussels, Flanders, and Wallonia).

See also
 King Baudouin Foundation
 Prince Laurent Foundation

Foundations based in Belgium
Climate change organizations
Environmental organisations based in Belgium
1994 establishments in Belgium
Organizations established in 1994
Organisations based in Belgium with royal patronage